Shirley LeFlore (1940 - 2019) was one of St. Louis' most influential performance art poets.  Before she became a board member for Word In Motion, she split her time between performances in New York City and teaching creative writing at the University of Missouri–St. Louis. One of the premiere women's voices in St. Louis, Shirley has been a part of many underground activists poetry organizations including the Black Artists' Group and Harmony. Brassbones and Rainbows, a collection of her work, is available from 2-Leaf Press. https://2leafpress.org/online/team/shirley-bradley-leflore/

Leflore was also a recipient of the Warrior Poet Award.

References

External links
  LeFlore's Readings

Writers from St. Louis
University of Missouri–St. Louis people
Living people
African-American poets
21st-century African-American people
1940 births